Clare Declares is an album by keyboardist/composer-arranger Clare Fischer, released in 1977 on the MPS label.  It features unaccompanied performances on an Austrian-made Rieger pipe organ, with liner notes provided by jazz critic and lyricist Gene Lees.

Track listing

Side One
 "Jazz Toccata in C Minor" Clare Fischer) - 6:57
 "If" (David Gates) - 4:18
 "Autumn Leaves" (Kosma) - 7:17
Side Two
 "I'll Take Romance" (Oakland) - 6:30
 "Cherokee" (Ray Noble) - 10:41

Personnel
Clare Fischer - pipe organ

References

External links 
 Excerpts from "Jazz Toccata...," "Autumn Leaves," & "I'll Take Romance" on YouTube

1977 albums
Clare Fischer albums
MPS Records albums